Phthonosema is a genus of moths in the family Geometridae described by Warren in 1894.

Species
Phthonosema tendinosaria (Bremer, 1864)
Phthonosema invenustaria (Leech, 1891)
Phthonosema phantomaria (Graeser, 1880)
Phthonosema serratilinea (Leech, 1897)

References

Boarmiini